Algeria–Sahrawi Republic relations refers to the current and historical relations between the People’s Democratic Republic of Algeria and the Sahrawi Arab Democratic Republic (SADR).

On 27 February 1976, the Polisario Front proclaimed the formation of the SADR. On 6 March 1976, Algeria recognized the SADR, the third country to do so, and formal diplomatic relations were established soon after. A Sahrawi embassy was opened in Algiers that year.  Algeria rejects claims by Morocco to Western Sahara territory, all of which is claimed by the SADR.

References

 
Sahrawi Arab Democratic Republic
Bilateral relations of the Sahrawi Arab Democratic Republic